Dilke may refer to:

 Dilke, Saskatchewan, a village in Canada
 Dilke baronets, a title in the Baronetage of the United Kingdom
 Lady Dilke (born Emilia Francis Strong; 1840–1904), British author, art historian, feminist and trade unionist

See also
 Charles Dilke (disambiguation)